Marcella Hazan (née Polini; April 15, 1924 – September 29, 2013) was an Italian cooking writer whose books were published in English.  
Her cookbooks are credited with introducing the public in the United States and the United Kingdom to the techniques of traditional Italian cooking. She was considered by chefs and fellow food writers to be the doyenne of Italian cuisine.

Biography

Hazan was born in 1924 in the town of Cesenatico in Emilia-Romagna. She earned double undergraduate  degrees in natural sciences and biology from the University of Ferrara and the University of Padua. She began her career as a science teacher. In 1955 she married Victor Hazan, an Italian-born, New York-raised Sephardic Jew who subsequently gained fame as a wine writer, and the couple moved to New York City a few months later.

Hazan had never cooked before her marriage. As she recounted in the introduction to her 1997 book Marcella Cucina: 

She began by using cookbooks from Italy, but then realized that her clear memory of the flavors she had tasted at home allowed her to reproduce them herself. "Eventually I learned that some of the methods I adopted were idiosyncratically my own," she recalled, "but for most of them I found corroboration in the practices of traditional Italian cooks."

Hazan began giving cooking lessons in her apartment and opened her own cooking school, the School of Classic Italian Cooking, in 1969. In the early 1970s, Craig Claiborne, who was then the food editor of the New York Times, asked her to contribute recipes to the paper. She published her first book, The Classic Italian Cook Book, in 1973. In 1980, having been published in a version adapted for a British readership by Anna Del Conte, it won an André Simon Award. A sequel, More Classic Italian Cooking, followed in 1978; the two were collected in one volume, Essentials of Classic Italian Cooking, in 1992. Her 1997 book Marcella Cucina won the James Beard Foundation book award for Best Mediterranean Cookbook and the Julia Child Award for Best International Cookbook  the following year. She wrote in Italian, and her books were translated by her husband.

Hazan's cookbooks concentrate on strictly traditional Italian cookery, without American or British influence. To that end, her recipes call for ingredients typical of the Italian home (with some concessions for ones not readily available outside Italy). They are also designed to fit into an Italian menu of two balanced 'principal courses' followed by a salad and dessert. Although Hazan prefers the painstaking approach of both preparing food by hand rather than machine and cooking it on burners atop the stove rather than in the oven, her recipes can yet be simple, one of the most popular of them (by her own report) consisting simply of a chicken roasted with two lemons in its cavity. Her celebrated recipe for Italian tomato sauce is frequently cited by the cooking section of the New York Times.

Among the techniques Hazan suggests are:

 Choose vegetables that are in season and plan the entire meal around them.
 Soak vegetables in cold water for half an hour before cooking to remove all trace of grit. Cook them until they are tender, but not mushy, so that they have a rich flavour.
 When sautéing onions, put them in a cold pan with oil and heat them gently; this will make them release their flavour gradually and give them a mellower taste than starting them in a hot pan.
 Although some types of pasta, like tagliatelle, are best made fresh at home, others, like spaghetti, should be bought dried. Pasta should be matched carefully to sauce.
 Olive oil isn't always the best choice for frying; in delicately flavoured dishes, a combination of butter and vegetable oil should be used.
 Garlic presses should be avoided at all costs.

Hazan frequently prefaces her recipes with descriptions of how the food is eaten in Italy, or with her own memories of it. For example, her recipe for coffee ice with whipped cream, included in Essentials of Classic Italian Cooking, begins: 

Hazan has been credited with starting a craze for balsamic vinegar, something she later regretted because she thought people were overusing it.

Craig Claiborne said of Hazan's work, "No one has ever done more to spread the gospel of pure Italian cookery in America". The food critic Jeffrey Steingarten, who once travelled to the Hazans' second home in Venice for a cooking lesson, predicted that Essentials of Classic Italian Cooking "will become the essential Italian cookbook for an entire generation". In a review of Marcella's Italian Kitchen for salon.com, Craig Seligman criticized Hazan's "impatient and judgmental tone", but added: "... her recipes are so beautiful and so reliable and, most of the time, so brilliantly simple that what can you do but venerate her and love her in spite of herself?" 

In 1998, Hazan retired from her cooking school, and she and Victor moved to Longboat Key, Florida. There Hazan found that she could no longer get some of the Italian ingredients she had taken for granted in New York, and she decided to write a cookbook for people in the same situation. The result was Marcella Says ..., published in 2004.

Hazan taught courses at the French Culinary Institute. In 2003 she was made a Knight of the Order of the Star of Italian Solidarity.

Marcella Hazan died on September 29, 2013, in Longboat Key, Florida.

Her son, Giuliano, is also a noted cookery writer and teacher.

Awards
 Maria Luigia, Duchess of Parma, Gold Medal (Italy)
 James Beard Foundation's Who's Who of Food and Beverage in America, 1986
 Silver Spoon Award from Food Arts magazine, 1992 (with Victor Hazan)
 Golden Cheese Knife, 1997 (Italy)
 James Beard Foundation Lifetime Achievement Award, 2000
 Cavaliere della Stella della Solidarietà Italiana (Knight of the Order of the Star of Italian Solidarity), Italy, 2003
 Lifetime Achievement Award, International Association of Culinary Professionals, 2004

Bibliography
The Classic Italian Cook Book: The Art of Italian Cooking and the Italian Art of Eating (1973)
More Classic Italian Cooking (1978)
Marcella's Italian Kitchen (1986)
Essentials of Classic Italian Cooking (1992) (The Classic Italian Cook Book and More Classic Italian Cooking combined and revised)
Marcella Cucina (1997)
Marcella Says: Italian Cooking Wisdom from the Legendary Teacher's Master Classes With 120 of Her Irresistible New Recipes (2004)
Amarcord: Marcella Remembers (Gotham Books, 2008)
Ingredienti: Marcella's Guide to the Market (with Victor Hazan, Scribner, 2016)

References

External links
Marcella Hazan Chef Profile at Epicurious
Marcella Hazan: Italian Cooking with a Master from National Public Radio. Radio interview in RealMedia or Windows Media.
James Beard Foundation press release
IACP biography
Blog cooking through Hazan's books

1924 births
2013 deaths
People from Cesenatico
Italian biologists
American women biologists
Italian women biologists
Italian emigrants to the United States
Italian food writers
American food writers
People from Longboat Key, Florida
Women cookbook writers
James Beard Foundation Award winners
International Association of Culinary Professionals award winners
21st-century American women
Mediterranean diet advocates